The Maya Mountains are a mountain range located in Belize and eastern Guatemala, in Central America.

Etymology 
The Maya Mountains were known as the Cockscomb or Coxcomb Mountains to Baymen and later Belizeans at least until the mid-20th century. Their current appellation is thought to be in honour of the Mayan civilisation.

Geography

Physical

Peaks 

Rivers 
Nine streams with a Strahler order greater than 1 flow from the Mountains into the Caribbean Sea, namely, five tributaries of the Belize River, two tributaries of the Monkey River, and the Sittee River and Boom Creek.

Karst 
Prominent karstic features within the Mountains include the Chiquibul Spring and Cave System, the Vaca Plateau, the Southern and Northern Boundary Faults, and possibly an aquifer contiguous with that of the Yucatan Peninsula.

Plutons 
The Mountains 'are the only source of igneous and metamorphic materials' in Belize. These are exposed in three plutons, ie Mountain Pine Ridge, Hummingbird Ridge, and the Cockscomb Basin. It has been recently suggested that the former was mined by stonemasons at Pacbitun for the manufacture and trade of stonetools, eg manos and metates.

Climate 

Human

Parks 
Much of the Mountains is in protected areas spanning seventeen parks, reserves, sanctuaries, or monuments in southern Belize and northern Guatemala.

Threats 
Unauthorised farming and resource extraction by Guatemalans have been identified as a significant threats to Belize's protected areas bordering Peten. For instance, in 2008 an estimated 1,0001,500 xateros ie fishtail palm foragers were operating in the region, and by 2011 some 13,50020,000 acres had been cleared for various agricultural activities, thereby severing the ecologically-important contiguity of Belizean forests to the Guatemalan Selva Maya. Furthermore, unlicensed interlopers often hunt for sustenance during their extended incursions, leading to worrying declines in wildlife populations, such as that of the white-lipped peccary, which has been extirpated from 'was once the species' primary stronghold in Belize [ie Chiquibul].' Threats indigenous to Belize have also been identified, however, with demographic pressures deemed the most significant. The recent construction of the hydroelectric Chalillo Dam in the Mountains, for instance, 'sparked international controversy for its widespread ecological effects,' including the inundation of 2,400 acres of forested and riparian ecosystems, and exposure of downstream villages to significant pollutants in 2009 and 2011.

Geology 

The Mountains and their abutting foothills and plains, considered as a north-easterly trending structural uplift of Palaeozoic bedrock, constitute a geologic or physiographic province in the Maya Block of the North American Plate. The province is bounded by the seismically inactive Northern and Southern Boundary Faults.

History 
The Mountains' orogen mainly consists of metamorphosed late Carboniferous to middle Permian volcanic-sedimentary rocks overlying late Silurian granites.

Stratigraphy

Basement 
The Mountains' basement is sub-aerially exposed in four extremes of the mountain range. The exposed portions in the northwestern, northeastern, and southeastern points of the range are predominantly composed of intermediate-to-silicic Palaeozoic plutons, with exposed portions in the southern point of the range predominated by Palaeozoic volcanic rocks.

The geologic evolution of the exposed portions of the Mountains' basement has been deemed 'one of the most disputed aspects of Central American geology,' though it has subsequently been suggested that these formed during the late-Neogene to late-Pliocene.

Cover 
The Mountains' sedimentary cover blankets all of the province's foothills and plains, and all but a few portions of its mountain range. The cover in the foothills and plains is predominantly composed of Cretacaeous marine strata to the south, west, and north, but this transitions into Quaternary alluvium to the east. In contrast, the cover in the mountain range is predominated by Palaeozoic strata.

The Mountains' cover in the mountain range has been recently characterised as an elevated relict landscape, ie an area where basement uplift has not been counterbalanced by fluvial erosion.

Formation 
Geologic mapping and dating of rocks in the Maya Mountains have 'led to a varierty of interpretations and eventually to puzzling discrepancies between reported field relations, age of fossils, and geochronologic data.' An early 1955 study divided the Mountains' sedimentary rocks into Macal and Maya series or formations, but these were subsequently rejected in favour of the single Santa Rosa Group of sedimentary rocks (discovered in Guatemala in 1966). However, this consensus was upended upon the 1996 discovery of deeper granitoids which crystallisation ages 'considerably older' than known post-Devonian ages of Santa Rosa fossils. The presence of pre-Devonian sediments was 'a matter of debate' until 'conclusively demonstrate[d]' in the affirmative in 2009.

Morphology

Basins 
The Mountains are wedged between the easterly to northeasterly trending Corozal and Belize Basins, themselves sub-basins of the PetenCorozal Basin, which fully encompasses the Mountains.

History

Pre-Columbian 
The Mountains are thought to have remained sparsely populated, and culturally and economically isolated, until 600830 CE, during the Late Classic, when the region experienced major demographic growth, possibly peaking in the 8th century. In  CE, during the Classic Maya Collapse, most of the Mountains' settlements experienced demographic decline, leading to sparse settlement during the Postclassic.

Columbian 
The mountains are mainly made of Paleozoic era granite and sediments.
The Maya Mountains and associated foothills contain a number of important Mayan ruins including the sites of Lubaantun, Nim Li Punit, Cahal Pech and Chaa Creek.

Conservation

In Belize 
The earliest public conservation-like efforts in Belize are thought to have been geared towards regulating mahogany logging, via a 28 October 1817 proclamation vesting unclaimed lands in the Crown. The measure quickly proved futile however, as by 17 April 1835 Belize's Superintendent would note that 'no regulation or restriction has prevailed respecting the cutting of Wood or the occupation of Land and thus the mahogany on the extensive Tracts to the Southward of the Sibun and between the Rivers Belize & Hondo above Black Creek has been subjected to great waste and devastation.' The next step is thought to have been in 1894, with the passage of the first legislative protections for antiquities in colonial Belize, subsequently strengthened in 1897, 1924, and 1927. Archaeological conservation in Belize progressed quickly with the 1952 appointment of Alexander Hamilton Anderson as First Assistant Secretary to the Governor with responsibility for archaeological activities in the country, and the subsequent 1954 establishment of the Department of Archaeology, with Anderson as its inaugural commissioner or permanent secretary. Natural conservation likewise advanced with the 1887 Hooper and 1921 Hummel Reports, the 1922 establishment of a Department of Forestry, with Cornelius Hummel as inaugural conservator or permanent secretary, and the 1924, 1926, 1927, 1935, 1944, and 1945 passages of legislative protections for flora and fauna. Significantly, Silk Grass and Mountain Pine Ridge were gazetted as forest reserves in 1920, making these Belize's earliest non-archaeological protected areas.

In Guatemala 
The earliest conservation efforts in Guatemala are thought to have been the 1921 and 1945 Leyes Forestales, leading to the 1955 establishment of the country's first protected areas, the Atitlán and Rio Dulce National Parks.

Study

Exploration 
The captains had been commissioned by the superintendent of colonial Belize, Edward Marcus Despard, and the visiting Spanish commissary, Enrique de Grimarest, to discover the source of the Sibun River, so as to ascertain the limits of the British settlement under the 1786 Convention of London.

Subsequent pioneering explorations were led by Henry Fowler in 1879, C. H. Wilson in 1886, Karl Sapper in 18861935, J. Bellamy in 1888, L. H. Ower in 19221926, C. G. Dixon in 19501955, and J. H. Bateson and I. H. S. Hall in 19691970. Sapper's trips have been deemed 'the first geologic expeditions' into the Mountains, while Ower's survey produced what has been called 'the first geological map of the Colony [of British Honduras, including the Mountains].'

See also

Notes and references

Explanatory footnotes

Short citations

Full citations

Print

Journals

Theses

Maps

Other

External links 

Mountains of Belize
Mountain ranges of Guatemala
Mountain ranges of Central America
Geography of Mesoamerica
Paleozoic North America